Mitchum is a brand of antiperspirant-deodorant, owned by New York-based personal care company Revlon. It is widely known for introducing the first commercially successful sweat blocking antiperspirant and its marketing tagline, "So effective you can skip a day," in use until 2007.

On June 16, 2022, its parent, Revlon, filed for Chapter 11 bankruptcy.

History
Mitchum was purchased by the Revlon Corporation in January 1970. Originally known as the Paris Toilet Company and then the Golden Peacock Company, the company carried a full line of cosmetics. Bill McNutt is credited with inventing the antiperspirant. Other products launched by Mitchum, include "Esoterica" which helped with removing age spots. Before the company was sold to Revlon, it had existed for two generations and was headquartered in Paris, Tennessee.

Composition

All versions of their product used to contain 20 percent of the antiperspirant Aluminium zirconium tetrachlorohydrex gly and the roll-on still does. In 2007, they re-branded their entire line with a new active ingredient, Aluminum sesquichlorohydrate 25 percent.  They went on to release a Smart Solid line, a water-based solid with a differing texture from most deodorants, that contained the original active ingredient.  A standard invisible solid was released with the old active ingredient as well, with the name "Mitchum Advanced Control."

Controversy
During the 1990 media controversy surrounding Arthur Scargill's handling of money donated for striking British miners, Mitchum used an image of the NUM leader, without his consent, under the slogan "Mitchum, for when you're really sweating!"  Scargill complained to the UK's Advertising Standards Association who criticised the acriticizednt as "highly distasteful".

References

External links
 Mitchum's Website
 Mitchum's UK Website
 Revlon Consumer Products Corp. profile
 Visit Downtown Paris website

Personal care brands
Revlon brands
Male grooming brands
Companies that filed for Chapter 11 bankruptcy in 2022